The 53rd Boat Race took place on 28 March 1896.  The Boat Race is an annual side-by-side rowing race between crews from the Universities of Oxford and Cambridge along the River Thames.  In a race umpired by former rower Frank Willan, Oxford won by two-fifths of a length in a time of 20 minutes 1 second, taking the overall record in the event to 30–22 in their favour.  It was their seventh consecutive victory and the narrowest winning margin since 1877.

Background

The Boat Race is a side-by-side rowing competition between the boat clubs of University of Oxford (sometimes referred to as the "Dark Blues") and the University of Cambridge (sometimes referred to as the "Light Blues").  The race was first held in 1829, and since 1845 has taken place on the  Championship Course on the River Thames in southwest London.  The rivalry is a major point of honour between the two universities, as of 2014 it is followed throughout the United Kingdom and broadcast worldwide. Oxford went into the race as reigning champions, having beaten Cambridge by  lengths in the previous year's race, and held the overall lead, with 29 victories to Cambridge's 22 (excluding the "dead heat" of 1877).

Oxford's coaches were G. C. Bourne who had rowed for Oxford in the 1882 and 1883 races, R. C. Lehmann, the former president of the Cambridge Union Society and captain of the 1st Trinity Boat Club (although he had rowed in the trials eights for Cambridge, he was never selected for the Blue boat) and Douglas McLean (an Oxford Blue five times between 1883 and 1887).  Cambridge were coached by Stanley Muttlebury who had rowed for Cambridge five times between the 1886 and 1890 races.  The umpire for the race for the eighth year in a row was Frank Willan who won the event four consecutive times, rowing for Oxford in the 1866, 1867, 1868 and 1869 races.

Crews
Five of the Cambridge crew had rowed in the previous year's race: boat club president Theodore Byram Hope, Herbert Aylward Game, Richard Yerburgh Bonsey, Thomas Jones Gibb Duncanson and Adam Searle Bell. The Oxford crew contained three former Blues, including Walter Erskine Crum who was making his third consecutive appearance in the event. Six of the Oxford crew and two Cantabrigians were educated at Eton College.

Race

Cambridge, the pre-race favourites, won the toss and elected to start from the Surrey station, handing the Middlesex side of the river to Oxford.   Starting at 1:03 p.m., the race was conducted in strong westerly winds and rain showers.  Cambridge started the faster of the crews and outrated Oxford by two strokes per minute, and by Craven Steps (approximately ) along the course) they held a one-third length lead.  With the bend in the river in their favour, Oxford drew level by the Mile Post, but by Harrods Furniture Depository Cambridge were ahead, holding a three-quarter length advantage by Hammersmith Bridge.  Into the rough water past the bridge, Oxford struggled and the Light Blues were clear at The Doves pub.  By Chiswick Steps they had extended the lead to one and a half lengths.

Despite being behind for most of the race, the Oxford stroke Harcourt Gilbey Gold maintained his crew's pace and rhythm and along Corney Reach (around  into the race) they were overlapping the Light Blue boat.  Encountering a challenging combination of wind and tide, Cambridge began to struggle by the brewery at Mortlake, and the Dark Blues took advantage, overtaking Cambridge and passed the finishing post two-fifths of a length ahead in a time of 20 minutes 1 second.  It was their seventh consecutive victory and the narrowest margin of victory since the 1877 race.  Author and former Oxford rower George Drinkwater described the race as "one of the most stubbornly contested that has ever been rowed".

References
Notes

Bibliography

External links
 Official website

1896 in English sport
The Boat Race
March 1896 sports events
1896 sports events in London